Célia Janete da Costa Coppi (born 17 April 1980) is a Brazilian handball player who plays for the club Metodista/São Bernardo. She is also member of the Brazilian national team. She competed at the 2015 World Women's Handball Championship in Denmark.

Titles
Pan American Women's Club Handball Championship:
2016

Individual awards and achievements

Best right wing
2016 Pan American Women's Club Handball Championship

Best player
Liga Nacional Feminina de Handebol 2016

Top scorer
Liga Nacional Feminina de Handebol 2016

References

1980 births
Living people
Brazilian female handball players
Pan American Games gold medalists for Brazil
Pan American Games medalists in handball
Handball players at the 2003 Pan American Games
Handball players at the 2015 Pan American Games
Medalists at the 2015 Pan American Games
21st-century Brazilian women